Bâton Rouge is a 1985 French film directed by Rachid Bouchareb.

Synopsis
In a town on the outskirts of Paris, Karim, Abdenour and Mozart search for small acting jobs. Karim's father reassures him that he will someday become someone important. Abdenour, orphaned, promises his brother that he may soon withdraw from welfare. Mozart, a saxophonist, dreams of going to America, to Baton Rouge, Louisiana, which he considers the capital of blues music. 

The dream soon becomes a reality in the wake of Abdenour falling in love with Becky, a young American, and thanks to one of his friend's tricks allows all of them to obtain airline tickets to New York City. Their pursuits continue across the Atlantic.

Cast
Jacques Penot : Alain Lefebvre 'Mozart'
Pierre-Loup Rajot : Abdenour
Hammou Graïa : Karim
Frédéric Wizmane : Bruno
Katia Tchenko : Director of DASS
Larbi Zekkal : Karim's father
Elaine Foster : Victoria Paine
Romain Bouteille : Monsieur Temporaire
Jacques Frantz : Fast-food manager
Christian Charmetant : Architect
Alexandra Steinbaum : Becky

External links

French comedy films
1985 films
1980s French-language films
Films directed by Rachid Bouchareb
1980s French films